The Song of the Nightingale (Spanish: Saeta del ruiseñor) is a 1959 Spanish musical film directed by Antonio del Amo and starring Joselito, Ivy Bless and Archibald L. Lyall.

Plot 
Joselito is a boy who lives in a small town in Seville. He has a sister named Carmela whom he woos "El Quico". As the child has a prodigious voice, her sister's boyfriend wants to take advantage of her since he wants to marry her, to which the boy refuses. Finally, meeting a blind girl named Alicia will make Joselito participate in a radio contest to be able to pay for the operation that can restore his vision.

Cast

References

External links

1959 musical films
Spanish musical films
Films directed by Antonio del Amo
Films produced by Cesáreo González
1950s Spanish films